The 77th Group Army is a military formation of the Chinese People's Liberation Army Ground Force (PLAGF). The 77th Group Army is one of twelve total group armies of the PLAGF, the largest echelon of ground forces in the People's Republic of China, and one of three assigned to the nation's Western Theater Command.

History 
The 13th Group Army (Military Unit Cover Designator (MUCD) 56005) was established in 1985 after the disbandment of the 50th Army. It incorporated the 149th Division, which had been part of the 50th Army.

During the Sino-Vietnamese War, the Kunming Military Region took responsibility for Chinese operations during the Battle of Lào Cai, which involved the 11th and 13th Armies from the Kunming Military Region itself, and the 14th Army from the Chengdu Military Region, totaling about 125,000 troops. The three armies was followed by the reserve 149th Division of the 50th Army, as well as many support units. The invasion comprised three prongs of advances: while the 11th Army was assigned to attack Phong Thổ before hooking up to Sa Pa and Lào Cai from the west, the 14th Army was ordered to take Mường Khương and move against Lào Cai from the east; the central thrust was undertaken by the 13th Army, targeting Lào Cai itself, as well as the township of Cam Đường to the south. 

Blasko 2002, drawing upon the Directory of PRC Military Personalities, 1999 and 2000 editions, wrote that the 13 GA (MUCD 56005), at Chongqing, comprised the 37th Motorized Infantry Division (MUCD 56013), the 149th Motorized Infantry Division (MUCD 56016) at Emei, Sichuan, an Armored Brigade (MUCD 56017) at Pengzhou, Sichuan, an Artillery Brigade (MUCD 56014) at Chongqing, and an Anti-Aircraft Artillery Brigade (MUCD 56018) at Mianyang, Sichuan.

Since 2002, various sources have identified the armored brigade as the 17th Armored Brigade and also added 2nd Helicopter Regiment and a Special Operations Group to the listing.

Leaders

Commanders
 Zhou Xihan: 1949–1952
 Chen Kang: 1952–1956
 Xu Qixiao: 1956–1965
 Wu Xiaomin: 1965–1968
 Gu Yongwu: 1968–1978
 Yan Shouqing: 1978–1980
 An Yufeng: 1980–1983
 Yang Anzhong: 1983–1985
 Chen Shijun: 1985–1994
 Gui Quanzhi: 1994–2000
 Zhang Youxia: 2000–2005
 Wang Xixin: 2005–2007
 Zhao Zongqi: 2007–2008
 Xu Yong: 2008–2013
 Wang Kai: 2013–present

Political commissars
 Liu Youguang: 1949–1951
 Jin Rubai: 1951–1954
 Zhang Lixiong: 1954–1955
 Kong Junbiao: 1955–1961
 Lei Qiyun: 1961–1969
 Duan Siying: 1965–1969
 He Yunfeng: 1969–1970
 Zhao Wei: 1970–1975
 Geng Zhongxian: 1975–1978
 Qiao Xueting: 1978–1982
 Ai Weiren: 1983–1988
 Xiao Huaishu: 1988–1993
 Chen Peizhong: 1993–1996
 Qiu Jian: 1996–2005
 Cui Changjun: 2005–2010
 Diao Guoxin: 2010–2012
 Zheng Xuan: 2013–present

References

Further reading 
 

Field armies of the People's Liberation Army
Military units and formations established in 2017